Love Means Zero is a 2017 American documentary film directed by Jason Kohn about tennis coach Nick Bollettieri and his troubled relationship with Andre Agassi.

The film had its world premiere at the 42nd Toronto International Film Festival on September 9, 2017. It was released on television by Showtime on June 23, 2018.

Synopsis
Nick Bollettieri coached a generation of tennis champions, but his relentless desire to win cost him the relationship he valued most.

Cast
 Nick Bollettieri
 Andre Agassi
 Carling Bassett-Seguso
 John F. Bassett
 Boris Becker
 Martin Blackman
 Bud Collins
 Jim Courier
 Barbara Becker
 Andrés Gómez
 Kathleen Horvath
 Goran Ivanišević
 Julio Moros
 Fritz Nau
 Jane Pauley
 Pete Sampras
 Brooke Shields

Awards and nominations

References

External links
 
 

2017 films
Tennis films
American documentary films
2017 documentary films
2010s English-language films
2010s American films